John Young, 1st Baron Lisgar  (31 August 1807 – 6 October 1876) was a British diplomat and politician. He served as Governor General of Canada (1869–72), Governor of New South Wales (1861–67) and as Chief Secretary for Ireland (1853–55). From 1848 to 1870 he was known as Sir John Young, 2nd Baronet.

Biography
Young was born into an Anglo-Irish family in Bombay, India, eldest son of Sir William Young, 1st Baronet of Bailieborough Castle, who was a director of the East India Company. He was educated at Eton and Corpus Christi College, Oxford, graduating in 1829 and was called to the bar in 1834. He married Adelaide Annabella Tuite Dalton in 1835.
In 1831 he became a Member of Parliament, as member for the county of Cavan in the House of Commons of the United Kingdom, a position he held for 24 years. In 1841 he was a Lord of the Treasury for Sir Robert Peel, Secretary of the Treasury in 1844 and Chief Secretary for Ireland from 1852 to 1855. Young was appointed Lord High Commissioner to the Ionian Islands in 1855. His secret despatches recommending that the islands become a British colony were leaked, leading to his recall in 1859.

Young was appointed Governor of New South Wales in 1860 and was immediately confronted by a crisis stemming from the attempt by the Secretary for Lands, John Robertson, to push radical land legislation through the Parliament. This legislation was passionately opposed by the majority of the Legislative Council. Young agreed to the request of the Premier, Charles Cowper, to swamp the council with new 21 appointees to get the legislation through, although in fact sufficient members of the Council resigned that a quorum could not be formed, forcing it to be prorogued and replaced by a new Council with appointed life members. In due course this passed the land legislation. The rest of his term in New South Wales was less eventful.

Young assumed the office of Governor General of Canada in 1868, when it was vacated by fellow Irishman, the 4th Viscount Monck, but did not officially take up the position until his swearing in on 2 February 1869. After the end of his term in 1872, he returned to Ireland.

He was raised to the peerage as Baron Lisgar, of Lisgar and Bailieborough, in the County of Cavan, on 26 October 1870.

He died on 6 October 1876 at Lisgar House (also known as Castle House), near Bailieborough in County Cavan, Ireland, survived by his wife. Although Lady Lisgar married once more, she and Lord Lisgar are buried in Bailieborough Church of Ireland Graveyard, Bailieborough, County Cavan.

Family

John Young married, on 8 April 1835, Adelaide Annabella Dalton, daughter of Edward Tuite Dalton of Fermor, County Meath, Ireland, and his wife, Olivia, daughter of Sir John Stevenson (who married, secondly, The 2nd Marquess of Headfort, K.P., P.C.). Dalton's date of birth is unknown however she was likely to have been born between 1811 and 1814. Her husband was raised to the peerage, as Baron Lisgar in 1870, and died on 6 October 1876. On 3 August 1878 Baroness Lisgar married her second husband, Sir Francis Charles Fortescue Turville of Bosworth Hall, Leicestershire. She married her third husband, Henry Trueman Mills, of Lubenham, Market Harborough. She died at Paris on 19 July 1895.

Legacy
 Lisgar Collegiate Institute on Lisgar Street in Ottawa takes its name from Lord Lisgar. A likeness of Lord Lisgar is prominently displayed in the school's library.
 Lisgar Street in Toronto and Lisgar Avenue in Saskatoon takes its name from Lord Lisgar.
 In Mississauga, Ontario, a community in the Meadowvale neighbourhood has been called Lisgar. In the fall of 2007, a new Lisgar GO Station was opened on the Milton GO train line, and a Lisgar Middle School in the neighbourhood within the Peel District School Board.
 The Sir John Young Hotel in Sydney, Australia is named after the baron
 Sir John Young Crescent, Woolloomooloo, Australia is named after the baron
The town of Young, NSW was named after the baron.
The lake in Tillsonburg Ontario was named after the Baron.  Lake Lisgar.

Arms

Notes

References
 Website of the Governor General of Canada

External links 

 
Photograph: Baron Lisgar in 1870. McCord Museum
Photograph: Baron Lisgar in 1870. McCord Museum
Photograph: Lady Lisgar in 1870. McCord Museum

Lisgar, John Young, 1st Baron
Lisgar, John Young, 1st Baron
Irish Conservative Party MPs
UK MPs 1831–1832
UK MPs 1832–1835
UK MPs 1835–1837
UK MPs 1837–1841
UK MPs 1841–1847
UK MPs 1847–1852
UK MPs 1852–1857
UK MPs who were granted peerages
Lisgar, John Young, 1st Baron
Lisgar
Members of the Parliament of the United Kingdom for County Cavan constituencies (1801–1922)
Lisgar, John Young, 1st Baron
Lisgar, John Young, 1st Baron
Lisgar, John Young, 1st Baron
Lord-Lieutenants of Cavan
Lisgar, John Young, 1st Baron
Lisgar, John Young, 1st Baron
People educated at Eton College
Alumni of Corpus Christi College, Oxford
Chief Secretaries for Ireland
Colony of New South Wales people
Politicians from Mumbai
John
Peers of the United Kingdom created by Queen Victoria